Dido, also known as Elissa, was the legendary founder and first queen of the Phoenician city-state of Carthage (located in modern Tunisia), in 814 BC. 
In most accounts, she was the queen of the Phoenician city-state of Tyre (today in Lebanon) who fled tyranny to found her own city in northwest Africa.
Known only through ancient Greek and Roman sources, all of which were written well after Carthage's founding, her historicity remains uncertain. The oldest references to Dido are attributed to Timaeus, who was active around 300 BC, or about five centuries after the date given for the foundation of Carthage.

Details about Dido's character, life, and role in the founding of Carthage are best known from the account given in Virgil's epic poem, the Aeneid, written around 20 BC, which tells the legendary story of the Trojan hero Aeneas. Dido is described as a clever and enterprising woman who flees her ruthless and autocratic brother, Pygmalion, after discovering that he was responsible for her husband's death. Through her wisdom and leadership, the city of Carthage is founded and made prosperous.

Dido remains an enduring figure in Western culture and arts since the early Renaissance and into the 21st century. 
In the early 20th century, she was also chosen as a national symbol in Tunisian nationalism and so Tunisian women can be poetically referred to "Daughters of Dido".

Dido (Elissa) has also been represented on Tunisian currency in 2006.

Name

Many names in the legend of Dido are of Punic origin, which suggests that the first Greek authors who mention this story have taken up Phoenician accounts. One suggestion is that Dido is an epithet from the same Semitic root as David, which means "Beloved". Others state Didô means "the wanderer".

According to Marie-Pierre Noël, "Elishat/Elisha" is a name repeatedly attested on Punic votives. It is composed of the Punic reflex of *ʾil- "god", the remote Phoenician creator god El, also a name for God in Judaism, and "‐issa", which could be either "ʾiš" (𐤀𐤎) means "fire", or another word for "woman". Other works state it is the feminine form of El. In Greek it appears as Theiossô, which translates Élissa: el becoming theos.

Early accounts

The person of Dido can be traced to references by Roman historians to lost writings of Timaeus of Tauromenium in Sicily (c. 356–260 BC).

Ancient historians gave various dates, both for the foundation of Carthage and the foundation of Rome. Appian, in the beginning of his Punic Wars, claims that Carthage was founded by a certain Zorus and Carchedon, but Zorus looks like an alternative transliteration of the city name Tyre, while Carchedon is just the Greek form of Carthage. Timaeus made Carchedon's wife Elissa the sister of King Pygmalion of Tyre. Archaeological evidence of settlement on the site of Carthage before the last quarter of the 8th century BC has yet to be found. Paucity of material for this period may be explained by rejection of the Greek Dark Age theory.
That the city is named  (Qart-hadasht, or "New City") at least indicates it was a colony.

The only surviving full account before Virgil's treatment is that of Virgil's contemporary Gnaeus Pompeius Trogus in his Philippic histories as rendered in a digest or epitome made by Junianus Justinus in the 3rd century AD.

Justin quoting or paraphrasing Trogus states (18.4–6), a king of Tyre whom Justin does not name, made his very beautiful daughter Dido and son Pygmalion his joint heirs. But on his death the people took Pygmalion alone as their ruler though Pygmalion was yet still a boy. Dido married Acerbas her uncle who as priest of Heracles—that is, Melqart—was second in power to King Pygmalion. Acerbas (Sicharbas, Zacherbas) can be equated with the Zikarbaal king of Byblos mentioned in the Egyptian Tale of Wenamon.
Rumor told that Acerbas had much wealth secretly buried and King Pygmalion had Acerbas murdered in hopes of gaining this wealth. Dido, desiring to escape Tyre, expressed a wish to move into Pygmalion's palace, but then ordered the attendants whom Pygmalion sent to aid in the move, to throw all Acerbas' bags of gold into the sea apparently as an offering to his spirit. In fact these bags contained only sand. Dido then persuaded the attendants to join her in flight to another land rather than face Pygmalion's anger when he discovered what had supposedly become of Acerbas' wealth. Some senators also joined her in her flight.

The party arrived at Cyprus where the priest of Jupiter joined the expedition. There the exiles also seized about eighty young women who were prostituting themselves on the shore in order to provide wives for the men in the party.

Eventually Dido and her followers arrived on the coast of North Africa where Dido asked the Berber king Iarbas for a small bit of land for a temporary refuge until she could continue her journeying, only as much land as could be encompassed by an oxhide. They agreed. Dido cut the oxhide into fine strips so that she had enough to encircle an entire nearby hill, which was therefore afterwards named Byrsa "hide". (This event is commemorated in modern mathematics:  The "isoperimetric problem" of enclosing the maximum area within a fixed boundary is often called the "Dido Problem" in modern calculus of variations.) That would become their new home. Many of the local Berbers joined the settlement and both Berbers and envoys from the nearby Phoenician city of Utica urged the building of a city. In digging the foundations an ox's head was found, indicating a city that would be wealthy but subject to others. Accordingly, another area of the hill was dug instead where a horse's head was found, indicating that the city would be powerful in war.

But when the new city of Carthage had been established and become prosperous, Iarbas, a native king of the Maxitani or Mauritani (manuscripts differ), demanded Dido for his wife or he would make war on Carthage. Still, she preferred to stay faithful to her first husband and after creating a ceremonial funeral pyre and sacrificing many victims to his spirit in pretense that this was a final honoring of her first husband in preparation for marriage to Iarbas, Dido ascended the pyre, announced that she would go to her husband as they desired, and then slew herself with her sword. After this self-sacrifice Dido was deified and was worshipped as long as Carthage endured. In this account, the foundation of Carthage occurred 72 years before the foundation of Rome.

Servius in his commentary on Virgil's Aeneid gives Sicharbas as the name of Dido's husband in early tradition.

Historicity and dating

The oxhide story which explains the name of the hill is most likely of Greek origin since Byrsa means "oxhide" in Greek, not in Punic. The name of the hill in Punic was probably just a derivation from Semitic brt "fortified place". But that does not prevent other details in the story from being Carthaginian, albeit still not necessarily historical. Michael Grant in Roman Myths (1973) claims that "Dido-Elissa was originally a goddess", and that she was converted from a goddess into a mortal (if still legendary) queen sometime in the later fifth century BCE by a Greek writer.

Others conjecture that Dido was indeed historical, as described in the following accounts. It is unknown who first combined the story of Dido with the tradition that connected Aeneas either with Rome or with earlier settlements from which Rome traced its origin. A fragment of an epic poem by Gnaeus Naevius who died at Utica in 201 BC includes a passage which might or might not be part of a conversation between Aeneas and Dido. Servius in his commentary (4.682; 5.4) cites Varro (1st century BC ) for a version in which Dido's sister Anna killed herself for love of Aeneas.

Evidence for the historicity of Dido (which is a question independent of whether or not she ever met Aeneas) can be associated with evidence for the historicity of others in her family, such as her brother Pygmalion and their grandfather Balazeros. Both of these kings are mentioned, as well as Dido, in the list of Tyrian kings given in Menander of Ephesus's list of the kings of Tyre, as preserved in Josephus's Against Apion, i.18. Josephus ends his quotation of Menander with the sentence "Now, in the seventh year of his [Pygmalion's] reign, his sister fled away from him and built the city of Carthage in Libya."

The Nora Stone, found on Sardinia, has been interpreted by Frank Moore Cross as naming Pygmalion as the king of the general who was using the stone to record his victory over the local populace. On paleographic grounds, the stone is dated to the 9th century BC. (Cross's translation, with a longer discussion of the Nora stone, is found in the Pygmalion article). If Cross's interpretation is correct, this presents inscriptional evidence substantiating the existence of a 9th-century-BC king of Tyre named (in Greek) Pygmalion.

Several scholars have identified Baa‘li-maanzer, the king of Tyre who gave tribute to Shalmaneser III in 841 BC, with  Ba‘al-'azor (Phoenician form of the name) or Baal-Eser/Balazeros (Greek form of the name), Dido's grandfather. This lends credibility to the account in Josephus/Menander that names the kings of Tyre from Abibaal and Hiram I down to the time of Pygmalion and Dido.

Another possible reference to Balazeros is found in the Aeneid. It was a common ancient practice of using the hypocoristicon or shortened form of the name that included only the divine element, so that the "Belus" that Virgil names as the father of Dido in the Aeneid may be a reference to her grandfather, Baal-Eser II/Balazeros.

Even more important than the inscriptional and literary references supporting the historicity of Pygmalion and Dido are chronological considerations that give something of a mathematical demonstration of the veracity of the major feature of the Pygmalion/Dido saga, namely the flight of Dido from Tyre in Pygmalion's seventh year, and her eventual founding of the city of Carthage. Classical authors give two dates for the founding of Carthage. The first is that of Pompeius Trogus, mentioned above, that says this took place 72 years before the foundation of Rome. At least as early as the 1st century BC, and then later, the date most commonly used by Roman writers for the founding of Rome was 753 BC. This would place Dido's flight in 753 + 72 = 825 BC. Another tradition, that of the Greek historian Timaeus (c. 345–260 BC), gives 814 BC for the founding of Carthage. Traditionally most modern scholars have preferred the 814 date. However, the publication of the Shalmaneser text mentioning tribute from Baal-Eser II of Tyre in 841 BC caused a re-examination of this question, since the best texts of Menander/Josephus only allow 22 years from the accession of Baal-Eser/Balazeros until the seventh year of Pygmalion, and measuring back from 814 BC would not allow any overlap of Balazeros with the 841 tribute to Shalmaneser. With the 825 date for the seventh year of Pygmalion, however, Balazeros's last year would coincide with 841 BC, the year of the tribute. Additional evidence in favor of the 825 date is found in the statement of Menander, repeated by Josephus as corroborated from Tyrian court records (Against Apion i.17,18), that Dido's flight (or the founding of Carthage) occurred 143 years and eight months after Hiram of Tyre sent assistance to Solomon for the building of the Temple. Using the 825 date, this Tyrian record would then date the start of Temple construction in 969 or 968 BC, in agreement with the statement in 1 Kings 6:1 that Temple construction began in Solomon's fourth regnal year. Solomon's fourth year can be calculated as starting in the fall of 968 BC when using the widely accepted date of 931/930 BC for the division of the kingdom after the death of Solomon. These chronological considerations therefore definitely favor the 825 date over the 814 date for Dido's departure from Tyre. More than that, the agreement of this date with the timing of the tribute to Shalmaneser and the year when construction of the First Temple began provide evidence for the essential historicity of at least the existence of Pygmalion and Dido as well as their rift in 825 BC that eventually led to the founding of Carthage.

According to J. M. Peñuela, the difference in the two dates for the foundation of Carthage has an explanation if we understand that Dido fled Tyre in 825 BC, but eleven years elapsed before she was given permission by the original inhabitants to build a city on the mainland, years marked by conflict in which the Tyrians first built a small city on an island in the harbor. Additional information about Dido's activities after leaving Tyre are found in the Pygmalion article, along with a summary of later scholars who have accepted Peñuela's thesis.

If chronological considerations thus help to establish the basic historicity of Dido, they also serve to refute the idea that she could have had any liaison with Aeneas. Aeneas fought in the Trojan War, which is conventionally dated anywhere from the 14th to the 12th centuries BC, far too early for Aeneas to have been alive in the time of Dido. Even with the date of 864 BC that historical revisionist David Rohl gives for the end of the Trojan War, Aeneas would have been about 77 years old when Dido fled Tyre in 825 BC and 88 when she began to build Carthage in 814 (following Peñuela's reconstruction), hardly consistent with the romantic intrigues between Dido and Aeneas imagined by Virgil in the Aeneid.

Virgil's Aeneid

Virgil's references in the Aeneid generally agree with what Justin's epitome of Trogus recorded. Virgil names Belus as Dido's father, this Belus sometimes being called Belus II by later commentators to distinguish him from Belus son of Poseidon and Libya in earlier Greek mythology.

Virgil (1.343f) adds that the marriage between Dido and Sychaeus, as Virgil calls Dido's husband, occurred while her father was still alive. Pygmalion slew Sychaeus secretly due to his wealth and Sychaeus appeared to Dido in a dream in which he told the truth about his death, urged her to flee the country, and revealed to her where his gold was buried. She left with those who hated or feared Pygmalion. None of these details contradicts Justin's epitome, but Virgil very much changes the import and many details of the story when he brings Aeneas and his followers to Carthage.

(1.657f) Dido and Aeneas fall in love by the management of Juno and Venus, acting in concert, though for different reasons. (4.198f) When the rumour of the love affair comes to King Iarbas the Gaetulian, "a son of Jupiter Ammon by a raped Garamantian nymph", Iarbas prays to his father, blaming Dido who has scorned marriage with him yet now takes Aeneas into the country as her lord. (4.222f) Jupiter dispatches Mercury to send Aeneas on his way and the pious Aeneas sadly obeys. Mercury tells Aeneas of all the promising Italian lands and orders Aeneas to get his fleet ready.

(4.450f)  Dido can no longer bear to live. (4.474) She has her sister Anna build her a pyre under the pretence of burning all that reminded her of Aeneas, including weapons and clothes that Aeneas had left behind and (what she calls) their bridal bed (though, according to Aeneas, they were never officially married.) (4.584f) When Dido sees Aeneas' fleet leaving she curses him and his Trojans and proclaims endless hate between Carthage and the descendants of Troy, foreshadowing the Punic Wars. (4.642) Dido ascends the pyre, lies again on the couch which she had shared with Aeneas, and then falls on a sword that Aeneas had given her. (4.666) Those watching let out a cry; Anna rushes in and embraces her dying sister; Juno sends Iris from heaven to release Dido's spirit from her body. (5.1) From their ships, Aeneas and his crew see the glow of Dido's burning funeral pyre and can only guess what has happened. At least two scholars have argued that the inclusion of the pyre as part of Dido's suicide—otherwise unattested in epic and tragedy—alludes to the self-immolation that took the life of Carthage's last queen (or the wife of its general Hasdrubal the Boetharch) in 146 BC.

(6.450f) During his journey in the underworld Aeneas meets Dido and tries to excuse himself, but Dido does not deign to look at him. Instead she turns away from Aeneas to a grove where her former husband Sychaeus waits.

Virgil has included most of the motifs from the original: Iarbas who desires Dido against her will, a deceitful explanation for the building of the pyre, and Dido's final suicide. In both versions Dido is loyal to her original husband in the end. But whereas the earlier Elissa remained always loyal to her husband's memory, Virgil's Dido dies as a tortured and repentant woman who has fallen away from that loyalty.

Virgil consistently uses the form Dido as nominative, but derivates of Elissa for the oblique cases.

Later Roman tradition
Letter 7 of Ovid's Heroides is a fictional letter from Dido to Aeneas written just before she ascends the pyre. The situation is as in Virgil's Aeneid. In Ovid's Fasti (3.545f) Ovid introduced a kind of sequel involving Aeneas and Dido's sister Anna. See Anna Perenna.

The Barcids, the family to which Hannibal belonged, claimed descent from a younger brother of Dido according to Silius Italicus in his Punica (1.71–7).

The Augustan History ("Tyrrani Triginta" 27, 30) claims that Zenobia queen of Palmyra in the late third century was descended from Cleopatra, Dido and Semiramis.

Continuing tradition

In the Divine Comedy, Dante puts the shade of Dido in the second circle of Hell, where she is condemned (on account of her consuming lust) to be blasted for eternity in a fierce whirlwind.

This legend inspired the Renaissance drama Dido, Queen of Carthage by Christopher Marlowe.

William Shakespeare refers to Dido twelve times in his plays:  four times in The Tempest, albeit all in one dialogue, twice in Titus Andronicus, and also in Henry VI Part 2, Antony and Cleopatra, Hamlet, Romeo and Juliet, A Midsummer Night's Dream, and most famously in The Merchant of Venice, in Lorenzo's and Jessica's mutual wooing:

The story of Dido and Aeneas remained popular throughout the post-Renaissance era and was the basis for many operas, with the libretto by Metastasio, Didone abbandonata, proving especially popular with composers throughout the eighteenth century and beyond:

 1641: La Didone by Francesco Cavalli
 1656: La Didone by Andrea Mattioli
 1689: Dido and Aeneas by Henry Purcell
 1693: Didon by Henry Desmarets
 1707: Dido, Königin von Carthago by Christoph Graupner
 1724: Didone abbandonata by Domenico Sarro
 1726: Didone abbandonata by Leonardo Vinci
 1740: Didone abbandonata by Baldassare Galuppi
 1742: Didone abbandonata by Johann Adolph Hasse
 1747: Didone abbandonata by Niccolò Jommelli
 1762: Didone abbandonata by Giuseppe Sarti
 1770: Didone abbandonata by Niccolò Piccinni
 1783: Didon by Niccolò Piccinni
 1823: Didone abbandonata by Saverio Mercadante
 1860: Les Troyens by Hector Berlioz
 2007: Aeneas and Dido by James Rolfe (composer)

Also from the 17th century is a ballad inspired by the relationship between Dido and Aeneas. The ballad, often printed on a broadside, is called "The Wandering Prince of Troy", and it alters the end of the relationship between the two lovers, rethinking Dido's final sentiment for Aeneas and rewriting Aeneas's visit to the underworld as Dido's choice to haunt him.

In 1794 Germany, Charlotte von Stein wrote her own drama named Dido, with an autobiographical element—as von Stein had been forsaken by her own lover, the famous Goethe, in a manner which she found reminiscent of Aeneas.

Will Adams' 2014 thriller The City of the Lost assumes that Dido fled only as far as Cyprus and founded a city on the site of modern Famagusta, that she died there and that Carthage was founded later, when Dido's followers fled further west after a vengeful expedition arrived from Tyre. In this interpretation, the two flights - from Tyre to Cyprus and from Cyprus to Carthage - were combined in later historical memory and all attributed to Dido. In Adams' account, the startling discovery of Dido's hideout and her well-preserved body happens accidentally during an attempted Coup D'etat by Turkish Army officers based in Cyprus.        

In another modern interpretation, Dido appears in Sid Meier's strategy games Civilization II and Civilization V, as the leader of the Carthaginian civilization, although she appears alongside Hannibal in the former. In Civilization V, she speaks Phoenician, with a modern Israeli accent. In 2019, Dido was made the leader of Phoenicia in Civilization VI: Gathering Storm, with Tyre as its capital and Carthage as an available name for subsequent cities.

In honor of Dido, the asteroid 209 Dido, discovered in 1879, was named after her. Another dedication of Queen Dido is the Mount Dido in Antarctica.

Remembrance of the story of the bull's hide and the foundation of Carthage is preserved in mathematics in connection with the Isoperimetric problem which is sometimes called Dido's Problem (and similarly the Isoperimetric theorem is sometimes called Dido's Theorem). It is sometimes stated in such discussion that Dido caused her thong to be placed as a half circle touching the sea coast at each end (which would add greatly to the area) but the sources mention the thong only and say nothing about the sea.

Carthage was the Roman Republic's greatest rival and enemy, and Virgil's Dido in part symbolises this. Even though no Rome existed in her day, Virgil's Dido curses the future progeny of the Trojans. In Italy during the Fascist administration of the 1920s to 1940s, she was regarded as a rival and sometimes negative figure, perhaps not only as a symbol of Rome's nemesis, but because she represented together at least three other unpleasant qualities: her reputation for promiscuity, her Semitic race, and for being a symbol of Rome's erstwhile rival Carthage. As an example, when the streets of new quarters in Rome were named after the characters of Virgil's Aeneid, only the name Dido did not appear.

Notes

Selected bibliography

 H. Akbar Khan, "Doctissima Dido": Etymology, Hospitality and the Construction of a Civilized Identity, 2002.
 Elmer Bagby Atwood, Two Alterations of Virgil in Chaucer's Dido, 1938.
 S. Conte, Dido sine veste, 2005.
 R. S. Conway, The Place of Dido in History, 1920.
 F. Della Corte, La Iuno-Astarte virgiliana, 1983.
 G. De Sanctis, Storia dei Romani, 1916.
 
 M. Fantar, Carthage, la prestigieuse cité d'Elissa, 1970.
 L. Foucher, Les Phéniciens à Carthage ou la geste d'Elissa, 1978.
 Michael Grant, Roman Myths, 1973.
 M. Gras/P. Rouillard/J. Teixidor, L'univers phénicien, 1995.
 H.D. Gray, Did Shakespeare write a tragedy of Dido?, 1920.
 G. Herm, Die Phönizier, 1974.
 T. Kailuweit, Dido – Didon – Didone. Eine kommentierte Bibliographie zum Dido-Mythos in Literatur und Musik, 2005.
 R.C. Ketterer, The perils of Dido: sorcery and melodrama in Vergil's Aeneid IV and Purcell's Dido and Aeneas, 1992.
 R.H. Klausen, Aeneas und die Penaten, 1839.
 G. Kowalski, 1929.
 A. La Penna, Didone, in Enciclopedia Virgiliana, II, 1985, 48–57
 F.N. Lees, Dido Queen of Carthage and The Tempest, 1964.
 J.-Y. Maleuvre, Contre-Enquête sur la mort de Didon, 2003.
 J.-Y. Maleuvre, La mort de Virgile d’après Horace et Ovide, 1993;
 L. Mangiacapre, Didone non è morta, 1990.
 P.E. McLane, The Death of a Queen: Spencer's Dido as Elizabeth, 1954.
 O. Meltzer, Geschichte der Karthager, 1879.
 A. Michel, Virgile et la politique impériale: un courtisan ou un philosophe?, 1971.
 R.C. Monti, The Dido Episode and the Aeneid: Roman Social and Political Values in the Epic, 1981.
 S. Moscati, Chi furono i Fenici. Identità storica e culturale di un popolo protagonista dell'antico mondo mediterraneo, 1992.
 R. Neuse, Book VI as Conclusion to The Faerie Queene, 1968.
 
 
 
 A. Parry, The Two Voices of Virgil's Aeneid, 1963.
 G.K. Paster, Montaigne, Dido and The Tempest: "How Came That Widow In?, 1984.
 B. Schmitz, Ovide, In Ibin: un oiseau impérial, 2004;
 E. Stampini, Alcune osservazioni sulla leggenda di Enea e Didone nella letteratura romana, 1893; 
 A. Ziosi, Didone regina di Cartagine di Christopher Marlowe. Metamorfosi virgiliane nel Cinquecento, 2015;
 A. Ziosi, Didone. La tragedia dell'abbandono. Variazioni sul mito (Virgilio, Ovidio, Boccaccio, Marlowe, Metastasio, Ungaretti, Brodskij), 2017.

Primary sources
Virgil, Aeneid i.338–368
Justinus, Epitome Historiarum philippicarum Pompei Trogi xviii.4.1–6, 8

External links

Selected English texts (Alternate links found in Wikipedia entries for the respective authors.)
 Forum Romanum: Justin 18.3f (Contains Justin (18.3–6) relating the early story of Elissa in full.)
 Translation of Virgil's works including the Aeneid by A. S. Kline
 Ovid's imagined letter from Dido to Aeneas, trans. Miceal F. Vaughan (See also Ovid.)
 Appian, The Punic Wars, chapter 1 (See also Appian.)
 Dido, Queen of Carthage , original text, modernization, and discussion of Chaucer's Legend of Dido
 The Tragedy of Dido, Queen of Carthage, by Christopher Marlowe (and Thomas Nashe?). (See also Christopher Marlowe.)
Commentary
 Greek Mythology Link: Dido
 Queen Dido: Didone Liberata (Mostly about a new four-act play by Salvatore Conte; it contains also a confutation of the well-known suicide into a subjective vision of Aeneas and his "comites" – 4.664, followed by Dido's catabasis)
 Warburg Institute Iconographic Database (about 900 images related to the Aeneid – Dido appears in Books I and IV)

9th-century BC Punic people
9th-century BC women rulers
Africa in Roman mythology
Ancient African women
Ancient Greeks in Africa
Ancient queens regnant
Carthaginian mythology
Carthaginian women
Characters in Book VI of the Aeneid
Deified women
Legendary Greek people
Legendary monarchs
Monarchs of Carthage
Mythological city founders
Phoenician characters in the Aeneid
Tunisian women
Women rulers in Africa
Articles containing video clips